USS LST-1065 was an  in the United States Navy. Like many of her class, she was not named and is properly referred to by her hull designation.

Construction
LST-1065 was laid down on 12 January 1945, at Hingham, Massachusetts, by the Bethlehem-Hingham Shipyard; launched on 17 February 1945; and commissioned on 16 March 1945.

Service history
Following World War II, LST-1065 performed occupation duty in the Far East and saw service in China until early January 1946. She was decommissioned on 23 May 1946, and struck from the Navy list on 23 June 1947. On 17 January 1948, the ship was sold to Compania Naviera y Commercial Perez Compano S.A., Buenos Aires, Argentina, for operation.

Notes

Citations

Bibliography 

Online resources

External links
 

 

LST-542-class tank landing ships
Ships built in Hingham, Massachusetts
1945 ships
World War II amphibious warfare vessels of the United States